The Reich Central Office for the Combating of Homosexuality and Abortion was the central instrument of Nazi Germany for the fight against homosexuality in Nazi Germany and the fight against abortion.

History
The Reichszentrale was created on 10 October 1936 by a special decree of the Reichsführer-SS Heinrich Himmler. Its creation was the sign of the revival of persecution of homosexuals during the relative calm after the 1936 Summer Olympics.  The primary task of the Reichszentrale was the collection of data about homosexuals.

The central archive of data allowed the Reichszentrale to coordinate and begin the persecution and punishment of homosexuals.  In order to do this, it had at its disposal special mobile squads, which also could carry out executions. By 1940 the section had already possessed data of some 41,000 homosexuals, both suspected and convicted.

From 1936 to 1938 SS official Josef Meisinger was the director of the section at the Gestapo Central Headquarters. Later it was led by criminologist advisor Erich Jacob.  In July 1943, Jacob became director of criminology and he worked beside psychiatrist and neurologist Carl-Heinz Rodenberg, who came on as scientific director.  A group of 17 workers was available to both of them.  The collection of records, which are believed to be about 100,000, was destroyed in all likelihood in the last days of the war.

In a campaign against the Catholic Church, many Catholic priests were arrested on unfounded charges of homosexuality and acts of perversion. These "morality" prosecutions were suspended to show foreigners a good image during the 1936 Olympic Games, but then resumed vigorously after Pope Pius XI had denounced Nazism in his 1937 encyclical Mit brennender Sorge. Clergy opposed to the regime, or holding views the Nazis disliked (for instance pacifism) were particularly targeted, with false charges of homosexual conduct hiding the real cause. Many, after they had served a prison sentence, were sent to concentration camps (usually the camp at Dachau, which had a special "priest block"). Some did not survive the experience.<ref name="trans">This article incorporates information from the corresponding article in the Spanish Wikipedia</ref>

See also
Persecution of homosexuals in Nazi Germany and the Holocaust
LGBT history in Germany
Abortion in Germany

Bibliography
 Grau, Günter: Homosexualität in der NS-Zeit. Dokumente einer Diskriminierung und Verfolgung'', Fischer, Frankfurt a.M. 2004, .
 Hutter, Jörg: "Die Rolle der Polizei bei der Schwulen- und Lesbenverfolgung im Nationalsozialismus" .

References

Persecution of homosexuals in Nazi Germany
Anti-abortion organizations
Abortion law
Anti-LGBT sentiment
Persecution of LGBT people
1936 establishments in Germany
1945 disestablishments in Germany
Gestapo
Organizations established in 1936
Organizations disestablished in 1945
Nazi Party organizations
Homophobia
Heinrich Himmler
Women in Nazi Germany
Discrimination against LGBT people in Germany